Giovannino (Italian for "Little John") may refer to:

 Giovannino (film), a 1976 comedy film 
 Giovannino Guareschi,  a journalist, cartoonist and humorist
 Giovanni Lorenzo Lulier, also known as  Giovannino del Violone,  a Baroque composer and musician
 Giuseppe Bonati, also known as  Giovannino del Pio,  a Baroque painter
 San Giovannino dei Cavalieri, a church in Florence
 San Giovannino degli Scolopi, a church in Florence